Wendy Patricia Hoyte (née Clarke; born 17 December 1957) is a British former sprinter, who won a 1982 Commonwealth Games gold medal and a 1982 European Championships silver medal in the 4 x 100 metres relay. She also competed at the 1976 Montreal Olympic Games. She is the holder of the United Kingdom indoor 50 m record, which she set in 1981. As of 2016, the record still stands.

Career
Hoyte was born in London, England. She was a member of Highgate Harriers and later the Borough of Hounslow Athletic Club. As Wendy Clarke, she first came to prominence at the age of 17 in 1975, when she won two medals at the European Junior Championships in Athens. She won bronze in the 100 m in a wind assisted 11.53 secs, behind the East German pair of Petra Koppetsch and Marlies Oelsner (the future Marlies Gohr), then won silver behind Koppetsch in the 200 m in 23.85.

In 1976, she competed in the sprint relay at the Montreal Olympics, running the first leg for the British quartet that finished eighth in the final. In 1979, she finished fourth in the 60 m final at the European Indoor Championships in Vienna. She was selected for the relay squad for the 1980 Moscow Olympics but did not get to compete.

In 1981, she broke the UK indoor record for the 50 m with 6.21 secs in the heats of the European Indoor Championships, before placing sixth in the final (usually a 60 m race, the event was held over 50 m in 1981). The record (as of 2014) has stood for over thirty three years. In the late 70s and early 80s she won six AAAs national titles. She was the AAAs 100 m champion in 1981 and 1982 and the AAAs indoor 60 m champion in 1977, 1980, 1981 and 1982.

Hoyte's best year was in 1982. Indoors, she won a bronze medal in the 60 m at the European Indoor Championships in Milan. At the European Championships in Athens she reached the 100 m final, placing eighth, then won a silver medal as part of the British 4 × 100 m relay quartet, along with Kathy Smallwood, Bev Callender and Shirley Thomas. At the Commonwealth Games in Brisbane, representing England, she finished fifth in the 100 m final and won a gold medal in the relay, along with Smallwood, Callender and Sonia Lannaman.

Hoyte missed trying for the 1984 Olympics due to pregnancy. In 1986, she competed at the European Championships in Stuttgart, finishing fifth in the 4 × 100 m relay final.

In 1987, Hoyte competed at three major Championships, she finished fifth in the 60 m final at the European Indoor Championships in Lievin and reached the semi-finals of the 60 m at the World Indoor Championships in Indianapolis. Outdoors, she ran in the sprint relay at the World Championships in Rome. She competed at the 1988 UK Olympic trials in Birmingham, but failed to earn Olympic selection.

Personal bests
50 metres 6.21 Grenoble 22 February 1981 (UK Record)
60 metres 7.20 Lievin 22 February 1987 (7th on UK all-time list)
100 metres 11.31 Brisbane 4 October 1982 
200 metres 23.48 London (Crystal Palace) 7 June 1975

Personal life
She is married to Les Hoyte, also a leading sprinter (brother of Trevor Hoyte, 1978 Commonwealth 200 m finalist), and is the mother of footballers Justin, a former England U21 and Trinidad & Tobago international, and Gavin, who plays for Barnet and was an England U19 international.  She is the aunt of the British sprinter Chris Clarke.

International competitions

Note: Results in brackets, indicate superior time achieved in an earlier round

References

External links 

 Profile

1957 births
Living people
Athletes from London
English female sprinters
Olympic athletes of Great Britain
Athletes (track and field) at the 1976 Summer Olympics
Athletes (track and field) at the 1980 Summer Olympics
Commonwealth Games gold medallists for England
Commonwealth Games medallists in athletics
Athletes (track and field) at the 1978 Commonwealth Games
Athletes (track and field) at the 1982 Commonwealth Games
European Athletics Championships medalists
World Athletics Championships athletes for Great Britain
Medallists at the 1982 Commonwealth Games